Tenagodus is a genus of sea snails, marine gastropod mollusks in the family Siliquariidae.

Species
Species within the genus Tenagodus include:
 Tenagodus anguinus (Linnaeus, 1758)
 Tenagodus armatus (Habe & Kosuge, 1967)
 Tenagodus barbadensis Bieler, 2004
 Tenagodus chuni (Thiele, 1925) 
 Tenagodus cumingii (Mörch, 1861)
 Tenagodus maoria (Powell, 1940) 
 Tenagodus modestus (Dall, 1881)
 Tenagodus norai (Bozzetti, 1998) 
 Tenagodus obtusiformis Martin, 1905
 Tenagodus obtusus (Schumacher, 1817)
 Tenagodus ponderosus (Mörch, 1861)
 Tenagodus senegalensis (Récluz in Mörch, 1860)
 Tenagodus squamatus (Blainville, 1827)
 Tenagodus sundaensis Dharma, 2011 
 Tenagodus tahitensis Mörch, 1861
 Tenagodus trochlearis Mörch, 1861 
 Tenagodus weldii Tenison-Woods, 1876 
 Tenagodus wilmanae (Tomlin, 1918) 
Species brought into synonymy
 Tenagodus anguillae Mörch, 1861: synonym of  Tenagodus squamatus (Blainville, 1827)

References

 Bruguière, Léon G. 1789. Encyclopedie méthodique. Histoire naturelle des Vers. Volume 1. 1-344. Panckouche & Plomteux. A. Bul. Paris & Liege. page(s): p.xv
 Vaught, K.C. (1989). A classification of the living Mollusca. American Malacologists: Melbourne, FL (USA). . XII, 195 pp.
 Gofas, S.; Le Renard, J.; Bouchet, P. (2001). Mollusca, in: Costello, M.J. et al. (Ed.) (2001). European register of marine species: a check-list of the marine species in Europe and a bibliography of guides to their identification. Collection Patrimoines Naturels, 50: pp. 180–213 
 Bieler R. 2004. Sanitation with sponge and plunger: western Atlantic slit-wormsnails (Mollusca: Caenogastropoda: Siliquariidae). Zoological Journal of the Linnean Society, 140(3): 307-333. page(s): 310

External links
  Bieler, R., 1992. Tenagodus or Siliquaria? Unravelling taxonomic confusion in marine "worm-snails" (Cerithioidea: Siliquariidae). The Nautilus, 106(1): 15-20 [27 February 

Siliquariidae